VR.5  is an American science-fiction television series first broadcast on the Fox network from March 10 to May 12, 1995. Ten of its thirteen episodes were aired during its original run. The title of the show refers to the degree of immersion the protagonist experiences in virtual reality.

Plot
Prior to the events of the series, Sydney Bloom was the daughter of Dr. Joseph Bloom, a computer scientist who was working on developing virtual reality.  His wife Nora Bloom, a neurochemist, was also involved in the project.  Sydney's father, and her sister Samantha, died in a car accident in 1978.

Now in 1995 Sydney is a telephone lineworker and computer hobbyist.  One day she accidentally discovers that she can enter an advanced type of virtual reality, where she can interact with other people.  Her actions in the virtual world have an effect on the real world.  She subsequently agrees to use her abilities to help a mysterious secret organization called the Committee.  She receives her covert assignments from Frank Morgan, and later from Oliver Sampson. Sydney's friend Duncan advises her and helps her when he can.

The show frequently uses inconsistencies in continuity and a distinctive color scheme as clues to suggest what is actually happening at various points throughout the series.

Cast
Lori Singer as Sydney Bloom
Michael Easton as Duncan
Will Patton as Frank Morgan (episodes 1-4)
Anthony Head as Oliver Sampson (episodes 5-13)
David McCallum as Joseph Bloom
Louise Fletcher as Nora Bloom
Tracey Needham as Samantha Bloom

Production

Development
VR.5, a mid-season replacement, debuted shortly after the rise to popularity of The X-Files, and executive producer Thania St. John stated that "VR will try to capture that same, creepy feeling."

Filming
The show's visual effects for when characters were inside virtual reality were created by shooting on black-and-white film and then manually adding color to each image. This effect took four weeks to create for each episode and added to the cost of the show, which was about U.S. $1.5 million per episode. While distributor Rysher Entertainment never confirmed it, the high cost of the production, coupled with a difficult time slot, contributed to the show's commercial failure.

Music
The music for VR.5 was created by composer John Frizzell. The opening theme music came to Frizzell in a dream. Dee Carstensen and Eileen Frizzell provided the vocals in the opening theme. The music supervisor of the series was Abby Treloggen. A soundtrack CD was released in 1995 on the Zoo Entertainment/BMG Music label.

Episodes 

"Sisters," "Send Me An Angel," and "Parallel Lives" were not broadcast on Fox. They are called the "missing episodes" and were broadcast in countries such as Canada, Norway, France and the United Kingdom. The series was eventually shown in its entirety on the Sci Fi Channel. The episode "Sisters" was not aired in the UK to make room for an "X-Files" documentary.

Legacy
The series was broadcast on CBS Drama in Europe in early 2014.

Virtual Storm, an online community, lobbied Fox to develop a movie featuring the cast and crew of VR.5, but the project was dropped after the scripting stage.

Home media
Episodes of VR.5 were released on VHS in 2000 by Rhino Home Video.

References

External links
 
 
 VR.5 FAQCenter Episode Guide
 FAQ with VR levels.

Fox Broadcasting Company original programming
1990s American science fiction television series
1995 American television series debuts
1995 American television series endings
Television series by CBS Studios
Television shows about virtual reality
Cyberpunk television series